Darozziafe minarets are two historical minarets in Isfahan, Iran. The minarets are located in the old Jouybareh district on the Ebn-e-Sina street. These 14th century minarets are built on the both sides of a portal. There is an inscription with white script on the ultramarine background under the above muqarnas. Only three Arabic words و من دخله have been remained, which mean someone, who enters.

See also 
 List of the historical structures in the Isfahan province

References 

Buildings and structures completed in the 14th century
Minarets in Iran
Buildings and structures in Isfahan